Enchelyurus petersi is a species of combtooth blenny found in the western Indian Ocean, in the Red Sea.  This species grows to a length of  SL. The specific name honours the German naturalist and explorer Wilhelm Peters (1815-1883) who named the genus Enchelyurus for the similar species E. flavipes in 1868.

References

petersi
Fish described in 1877